Lyutsun Bay (Russian: Zaliv Lyutsun) is a small bay in the western Sea of Okhotsk. To its west lies Uda Gulf, while to its north and east lies the Shantar Sea, and to its south and east Tugur Bay.

Geography and climate

Lyutsun Bay is entered between Capes Mal Dugandzha to the west and Bol Dugandzha to the east. Tides are semidiurnal, with springs rising  and neaps . Tidal currents reach 3.5 to 4 knots at springs near the entrance of the bay, with the flood current going in a counterclockwise direction round the bay and the ebb in the opposite direction. The bay is sheltered from southwest and southeast winds but exposed to south and northeast winds.

History

American whaleships cruising for bowhead whales in the 1850s and 1860s anchored in and off the bay while making their way from Uda Gulf to Tugur Bay. Boat crews searching for whales also encamped in the bay. They called it Horseshoe Bay.

References

Bays of the Sea of Okhotsk
Bays of Khabarovsk Krai